WEC 44: Brown vs. Aldo was a mixed martial arts event held by World Extreme Cagefighting. It took place on November 18, 2009 at The Pearl at The Palms in Las Vegas, Nevada.

Background
Anthony Pettis was originally slated to face Rob McCullough at this event, but was forced from the bout due to an injury, and was replaced by promotional newcomer Karen Darabedyan.

A lightweight bout between Danny Castillo and Alex Karalexis was once attached to this event, though it was later scrapped. Both men remained on the card with new opponents, as Castillo was matched with Shane Roller, while Karalexis was expected to face the debuting Kamal Shalorus. However, Karalexis had to bow out of the Shalorus matchup due to a broken hand, and was replaced by fellow WEC newcomer Will Kerr.

The event drew an estimated 414,000 viewers on Versus.

Results

Bonus Awards

Fighters were awarded $10,000 bonuses.

Fight of the Night:  Cub Swanson vs.  John Franchi
Knockout of the Night:  José Aldo
Submission of the Night:  Shane Roller

Reported payout 
The following is the reported payout to the fighters as reported to the Nevada State Athletic Commission. It does not include sponsor money or "locker room" bonuses often given by the WEC and also do not include the WEC's traditional "fight night" bonuses.

José Aldo: $26,000 (includes $13,000 win bonus) def. Mike Brown: ($15,000)
Manvel Gamburyan: $36,000 ($18,000 win bonus) def. Leonard Garcia: ($14,000)
Karen Darabedyan: $6,000 ($3,000 win bonus) def. Rob McCullough: ($20,000)
Shane Roller: $24,000 ($12,000 win bonus) def. Danny Castillo: ($9,500)
Kamal Shalorus: $6,000 ($3,000 win bonus) def. Will Kerr: ($2,000)
LC Davis: $14,000 ($7,000 win bonus) def. Diego Nunes: ($5,000)
Cub Swanson: $18,000 ($9,000 win bonus) def. John Franchi: ($4,000)
Antonio Banuelos: $12,000 ($6,000 win bonus) def. Kenji Osawa: ($6,000)
Ricardo Lamas: $8,000 ($4,000 win bonus) def. James Krause: ($2,000)
Frank Gomez: $6,000 ($3,000 win bonus) def. Seth Dikun: ($3,000)

See also
 World Extreme Cagefighting
 List of World Extreme Cagefighting champions
 List of WEC events
 2009 in WEC

External links
Official WEC website
WEC 44 Results Winners

References

World Extreme Cagefighting events
2009 in mixed martial arts
Mixed martial arts in Las Vegas
2009 in sports in Nevada
Palms Casino Resort